The Bangladesh cricket team toured Sri Lanka for three Test matches and three One Day Internationals in June and July 2007. This series held Mohammad Ashraful's first Test and ODI matches as captain of Bangladesh. Sri Lanka ended up winning all the Test matches and One-day Internationals.

Squad lists

Test series

1st Test

Chaminda Vaas and Prasanna Jayawardene both recorded their first Test career centuries, both during the same partnership during the Sri Lankan innings. In addition, the partnership – worth 223 runs without dismissal (Sri Lanka declared their innings once Vaas reached his hundred) – set a seventh-wicket record for Sri Lanka.

2nd Test

Bangladesh's first innings of 62 all out is the lowest innings total for Bangladesh. Mohammad Ashraful and Mushfiqur Rahim 6th wicket partnership of 191 was a record partnership for Bangladesh.

3rd Test

Day 1

With the 3 Test series already won Sri Lanka made 3 changes to their side. Chaminda Vaas was replaced by Sujeewa de Silva, while Upul Tharanga, recovered from a heel injury to take the place of Malinda Warnapura. Farveez Maharoof came in for Dilhara Fernando. Bangladesh made 2 changes to their side with Syed Rasel replacing Mohammad Sharif and Tushar Imran in for Mehrab Hossain Jnr.

For the third time in this Test series Mahela Jayawardene won the toss and chose to field. This meant that Javed Omar and Shahriar Nafees opened for Bangladesh. Lasith Malinga made an early breakthrough dismissing Omar lbw for 8 in the second over. This wicket would be the only wicket in the session as Habibul Bashar and Nafees batted until play was stopped due to rain and Bangladesh were on 44/1

On the fourth ball after the rain interval Habibul Bashar was caught behind. This resulted in Bangladesh making slow progress scoring only 5 runs in 5 overs before play was interrupted by rain again. Play resumed with the score at 53/2 and Bangladesh struggled to get runs and went through 3 maiden overs. Rajin Saleh was eventually removed, caught edging a doosra from Muralitharan to Mahela Jayawardene. Lack of scoring opportunities then saw Nafees take a rash shot which resulted in him being caught. This was the final wicket of the day and Bangladesh scored eight more runs in the day and the score was 72/4 at the end of day 1.

Day 2

A wet outfield threatened to delay the start of play but sunny conditions insured that the game started at the planned time of 10:30. Bangladesh began the day at 72/4 with Tushar Imran on 6 and Mohammed Ashraful on 4.  Steady progress was made with 20 runs scored of 5.3 overs before Imran was caught mistiming a drive shot. A boundary by Ashraful in the 37th over saw Bangladesh pass the 100 mark and the over finished 102/5. Shortly afterwards however Ashraful was caught behind with the score on a nelson and Bangladesh were 111/6. Bangladesh scored 20 runs for the final 4 wickets as Mashrafe Mortaza and Mohammad Rafique were caught and bowled by Muralitharan while Shahadat Hossain and Syed Rasel both went for a duck. At the end of Bangladesh's first innings Shahriar Nafees was the leading scorer with 29 runs, while Muralitharan was the top wicket taker getting 6 wickets in the innings.

The rest of the day was hampered by rain and bad light with Sri Lanka only managing to bat for 8.4 overs scoring a quick 30 without loss before the end of the day 2.

Day 3

The third day was dominated by Sri Lanka with scores of 165 and 222 by Mahela Jayawardene and Sangakkara respectively which included a 311 3rd wicket partnership.

The day started well for Bangladesh as they got the early wickets of Upul Tharanga and Michael Vandort. Upul Tharanga was bowled by Syed Rasel in the 14th over while Michael Vandort was trapped lbw and Sri Lanka were 74/2. Mahela Jayawardene and Sangakkara then put on 311 for the 3rd wicket before Jayawardene was dismissed on 165 caught by Mohammed Ashraful of Syed Rasel's bowling. Sangakkara was dropped by Mohammed Ashraful on 188 but he managed to run out Chamara Silva instead. On the 104th over Sangakkara made his second double century in the series hitting a full toss down square leg for 4. Quick batting by Tillakaratne Dilshan and Sangakkara meant that Sri Lanka finished the day on 500/4.

Day 4

Sri Lanka made an overnight declaration which meant that Bangladesh required 369 runs to avoid another innings defeat.

Omar and Nafees opened for Bangladesh once again and showed some resistance scoring 47 before Javed Omar edged a bouncer of Lasith Malinga and was caught in the 16th over by Sangakkara. Shahriar Nafees was the first Bangladeshi to get a half century in this Test reaching it in 70 balls. Soon after Habibul Bashar was bowled by Muralitharan and Bangladesh were 98/2. 6 more overs were played in the morning session before play was stopped due to rain and lunch was taken early with the score at 106/2.

Soon after the restart Shahriar Nafees is deceived by a spinning delivery and is out caught. Ashraful soon followed as he was trappt lbw with the score on 138/4. The next 4 runs then cost Bangladesh 2 wickets as Mushfiqur Rahim was caught by Upul Tharanga at point while Rajin Saleh was caught behind going for a duck and Bangladesh were 142/6. Mashrafe Mortaza and Tushar Imran made 24 runs for the 7th wicket before Mortaza's attempted six didn't carry and was caught at long on by the sub. The final 3 wickets went for 8 runs, with the final wicket of Syed Rasel being Muralitharan's 700th wicket and Sri Lanka won by an innings and 193 runs.

Muttiah Muralitharan was the man of the match with two 5 wicket hauls of 6/28 and 6/54 in the Test, getting his 20th 10-wicket haul in the process and had match figures of 12/82. Muttiah Muralitharan was also voted man of the series.

ODI series

1st ODI

2nd ODI

3rd ODI

Tour matches

Bangladeshis v Sri Lanka A – First-class match

Bangladeshis v Sri Lanka XI

References

 
 Cricinfo: Bangladesh in Sri Lanka

2007 in Bangladeshi cricket
2007 in Sri Lankan cricket
2007
International cricket competitions in 2007
Sri Lankan cricket seasons from 2000–01